The Citizen Revolution Movement is a democratic socialist political party in Ecuador formed by supporters of former President Rafael Correa who distanced themselves from Correa's former PAIS Alliance party during the presidency of Lenín Moreno. The party takes its name from the term used to refer to the project of building a new society.

History 
The party has its origins in early January 2018, as former Ecuadorian President and PAIS leader Rafael Correa left the ruling party over disagreement with the new direction of the party under Lenín Moreno. The party was formed by Correa and a large faction of left-wing PAIS defectors shortly after Correa left PAIS.

The party faced difficulties in obtaining official registration, as Ecuador's electoral authorities refused to register the party and give it access to the signature collection system, as they stated the party was using the symbols and slogans of the PAIS Alliance. The movement's leaders then attempted to register the party under the name "Revolutionary Alfarist Movement", named after former Ecuadorian President Eloy Alfaro, but this was also rejected by Ecuador's electoral authorities. The party's authorities blamed "political direction" by Lenín Moreno's government for these refusals, accusing them of seeking to "prevent the political participation" of the movement and its members.

The 11 April 2021 presidential election run-off vote ended in a win for conservative former banker, Guillermo Lasso, taking  52.4% of the vote compared to 47.6% of the candidate of Citizen Revolution Movement, left-wing economist Andrés Arauz, supported by exiled former president, Rafael Correa.

In June 2021 it was reported that Arauz had resigned the leadership of the Citizen Revolution movement and he was briefly replaced by Raisa Corral who is a legislator for Manabi. She was succeeded by Marcela Aguiñaga as president of the Citizen Revolution Movement later in 2021.

References

External links
 

2018 establishments in Ecuador
Left-wing nationalist parties
Political parties established in 2018
Political parties in Ecuador
Socialist parties in Ecuador
Socialism of the 21st century
Ecuadorian nationalism